Tuanku Ja’afar ibni Almarhum Tuanku Abdul Rahman  (19 July 1922 – 27 December 2008) was the tenth Yang di-Pertuan Agong (King) of Malaysia from 26 April 1994 until 25 April 1999 and the tenth Yang Di-Pertuan Besar (Ruler) of Negeri Sembilan.

Early life and education

Duli Yang Maha Mulia Tuanku Abdul Rahman ibni Almarhum Tuanku Muhammad married Che Engku Maimunah bt Abdullah nee Dulcie Campbell in 1919. The couple subsequently divorced. They had two sons and two daughters who are Tuanku Ja'afar, Tunku Abdullah, Tunku Aidah and Tunku Sheila. Tuanku Ja'afar ibni Almarhum Tuanku Abdul Rahman was born on 19 July 1922 in Klang, Selangor and was raised in Seri Menanti, Negeri Sembilan.

Growing up in an affectionate and considerate family had a profound impact on Tuanku Ja'afar's character. He had a very close relationship with all his siblings. He also emulated his father's practice of visiting the local villagers and performing Friday prayers at Masjid Seri Menanti with his subjects. This childhood experience helped form Tuanku Ja'afar's extraordinary character as an approachable and highly respected individual. Tuanku Ja'afar received his primary education at the Seri Menanti Malay School. Tuanku Ja'afar then continued his studies at the Malay College Kuala Kangsar or better known as MCKK. Sports were a compulsory subject at MCKK. Thanks to his zeal and talent for sports, Tuanku Ja'afar shone in a number of sports and was made the captain for five teams which were cricket, tennis, squash, football and hockey. On top of that, Tuanku Ja'afar was also an impressive badminton and chess player. It was at MCKK that he became close with Tun Abdul Razak Hussein, who was the second Prime Minister of Malaysia.

In 1940, after graduating from MCKK, Tuanku Ja'afar furthered his studies at Raffles College, Singapore. At the time, Raffles College was one of the popular higher education institutions in South East Asia.
Tuanku Ja'afar had always favoured sports over studies. As a keen tennis player, he would always play with Lee Kuan Yew, the first Prime Minister of Singapore. Tuanku Ja'afar, who was supposed to complete the three-year programme, unfortunately had to return to Malaya due to the start of the Second World War in December 1941.

Early career

State Officer

Tuanku Ja'afar's return from Singapore did not dampen his high ambitions and thirst for knowledge. During the Japanese occupation of Malaya, he worked at the Seremban Land Office, Rembau and also Kuala Lumpur. Then, in the late 1940s, he was transferred to the Perak State Secretariat in Ipoh and was in charge of processing citizenship applications.

In 1946, Tuanku Ja'afar started working in the Malay Administrative Service. Later in 1947, Tuanku Ja'afar was promoted to the position of Tax Assistant in Rembau, Negeri Sembilan. Tuanku Ja'afar was then promoted as the District Officer in Tampin, Negeri Sembilan until 1955 and supported anti-communist campaign. At this time he was also the Chairman of the Tampin District War Committee. Tuanku Ja'afar's experiences and observation during the war years had enriched him. At this time in his life, he now had a higher goal: he wished to further his studies in law.

He spent four years at University of Nottingham and graduated with a Bachelor of Laws in 1947 before attending Balliol College, Oxford and the LSE. This decision is driven by his interest in the subject of humanitarian, social and economic sciences. Tuanku Ja'afar was accompanied by Tuanku Najihah and their kids. While at university, he continued playing his favourite sports of cricket, football and badminton. He was also made captain of the Tennis Club and badminton.

Upon his return from the United Kingdom in 1952, Tuanku Ja'afar held several posts in the civil service of the Malaysia including Assistant State Secretary of Perak, Assistant District Officer of Parit, Perak, and District Officer of Tampin.

Diplomat

Tuanku Ja'afar's diplomatic career began in 1957. Tuanku Ja'afar was chosen to attend a one-year Diplomatic Service Course in London. While attending a one-year Diplomatic Service Course in London, the independence entourage led by Tunku Abdul Rahman Putra Al-Haj arrived. Their purpose was to negotiate with the officers from the British Colonial Office at Lancaster House, London to obtain independence. Tuanku Ja'afar assisted with the logistics, proposal papers and presentations. The entourage succeeded in achieving its goal when the British eventually consented to give independence to the Federation of Malaya. This news was greeted with great joy and an official ceremony was then held at the Dataran Merdeka, Kuala Lumpur on 31 August 1957.
His first appointment was as Charge d' Affaires in Embassy of Malaysia, Washington, D.C., United States of America followed by First Secretary with the Permanent Mission to the United Nations in New York, Consular and Deputy High Commissioner at the High Commission of Malaysia, London. Tuanku Ja'afar was later appointed as the Malaysian Ambassador to Egypt and then as High Commissioner to Nigeria and Ghana.

42 years as the 10th Yang di-Pertuan Besar of Negeri Sembilan
Tuanku Ja'afar was to have left for Japan to serve as the Malaysian Ambassador to that country but was recalled by the State Government of Negeri Sembilan following the demise of his half brother Tuanku Munawir, the then ruler of Negeri Sembilan, in 1967.

In line with the royal customs of Negeri Sembilan, before proceeding with the burial ceremony of the late Tuanku Munawir, a new ruler must be selected to succeed the late Yang di-Pertuan Besar.

Therefore, all four Undang (Ruling Chiefs of Negeri Sembilan) conferred to choose the late Tuanku Munawir's successor.

The selection of Tuanku Munawir's successor had to be made from four eligible princes, Putera Yang Empat:

1. Tunku Besar Seri Menanti, Tunku Muhriz ibni Almarhum Tuanku Munawir

2. Tunku Laksamana, Tunku Nasir Alam ibni Almarhum Tuanku Muhammad

3. Tunku Muda Serting, Tunku Ja'afar ibni Almarhum Tuanku Abdul Rahman

4. Tunku Panglima Besar, Tunku Abdullah ibni Almarhum Tuanku Abdul Rahman

The Undang Yang Empat unanimously decided on Tunku Muda Serting, Tunku Ja'afar ibni Tuanku Abdul Rahman, who was 44 years old at the time, to succeed his elder brother as the Yang di-Pertuan Besar of Negeri Sembilan. This proclamation was made by Dato' Undang Luak Jelebu, Dato' Abu Bakar bin Ma'amor, at Balairung Seri Istana Besar Seri Menanti. Tuanku Ja'afar ascended the throne as the 10th Ruler of Negeri Sembilan on 18 April 1967.

10th Yang di-Pertuan Agong of Malaysia

Tuanku Ja'afar was the tenth Yang di-Pertuan Agong of Malaysia from 26 April 1994 until 25 April 1999 succeeding Sultan Azlan Shah of Perak. On 26 April 1994, two months after he was chosen as the 10th Yang di-Pertuan Agong, Tuanku Ja'afar left Istana Besar Seri Menanti, Negeri Sembilan, for Istana Negara, Kuala Lumpur for the Installation Ceremony held at Balairung Seri Istana Negara. This auspicious event was witnessed by all Malay Rulers or their representatives. As the Yang di-Pertuan Agong, Tuanku Ja'afar played a significant role in fostering ties between Malaysia and other countries.

Malaysia achieved many milestones while he was the Yang di-Pertuan Agong, among them Malaysia's successful hosting of the 16th Commonwealth Games and APEC Summit, both in 1998. He also worked on Kuala Lumpur International Airport (KLIA) in Sepang, the Petronas Twin Towers, the Multimedia Super Corridor (MSC) and the new administrative capital of Putrajaya.

Issue

Tuanku Ja'afar married Tuanku Najihah binti Almarhum Tunku Besar Burhanuddin of Negeri Sembilan in 1942 until his death in 2008, who also served as his Raja Permaisuri Agong between 1994 and 1999. They had issue, 3 sons and 3 daughters:
 Tunku Dara Negeri Sembilan Tunku Tan Sri Naquiah binti Almarhum Tuanku Ja'afar (b. 1944)
Tunku Laksamana Negeri Sembilan Tunku Dato' Seri Utama Naquiyuddin ibni Almarhum Tuanku Ja'afar (b. 1947)
 Tunku Muda Serting Negeri Sembilan Tunku Tan Sri Dato' Seri Imran ibni Almarhum Tuanku Ja'afar (b. 1948)
 Tunku Puteri Negeri Sembilan Tunku Puan Sri Dato' Seri Jawahir binti Almarhum Tuanku Ja'afar (b. 1952)
 Tengku Puan Panglima Raja Selangor Tunku Dato' Seri Irinah binti Almarhum Tuanku Jaafar (b. 1957)
Tunku Panglima Besar Negeri Sembilan Tunku Dato' Seri Nadzaruddin ibni Almarhum Tuanku Ja'afar (b. 1959)

Contributions
During his reign as the ruler of Negeri Sembilan, Tuanku Ja'afar focused his attention on the problems of the people and the administration of the state. In handling the socio-economic affairs of the state, Tuanku Ja'afar directed his attention to the industry and public housing sectors so as to improve the living standard of the people. As a result, several new housing areas were developed among which is Taman Tuanku Ja'afar which includes an industrial area and a golf course of international standard, Taman Tuanku Ampuan Najihah in Sungai Gadut and the Mambau housing project. The construction of these housing areas improved the people's chances of owning their own property.  This enabled them to enjoy a better standard of comfort. The expansion of the industrial sector paved way for more job opportunities for his subjects, thus improving their standard of living and also eradicating poverty amongst the people of Negeri Sembilan. He also endorsed the setting up of various recreational facilities to encourage families to spend quality time outdoors.

Education
 
Universiti Kebangsaan Malaysia (UKM) was officially established on 18 May 1970 and is the third oldest university in Malaysia. UKM has always made great efforts to elevate our national language as a medium for education and is the first Malay-medium university, where the language is used in teaching and learning process. It is customary for a higher education institution in Malaysia to be patroned by a Chancellor. Yang Amat Berhormat Tun Razak helmed UKM as its first Chancellor from 7 July 1970 till 14 January 1976.

As the pioneer Chancellor, Tun Razak became a symbol of recognition for the university. Tun Razak was then succeeded by UKM's second chancellor, Tuanku Ja'afar became the second Chancellor of UKM on 16 April 1976. Tuanku Ja'afar had always urged for the improvement of the standard of education in Malaysia. He was awarded Honorary Doctorate of Law by several universities namely the University of the Philippines (27 July 1990), University of Nottingham (21 July 1995), University of Santiago, Chile (28 September 1995) and University of Brunei Darussalam (11 September 1996).

During Tuanku Ja'afar's chancellorship, UKM achieved many significant milestones such as:

1. The appointment as a research university. There are only four research universities in Malaysia.

2. The establishment of Malaysia Genome Institute and Institute of Global Health, United Nations University.

3. Listed in the Times Higher Education Supplement (THES) and secured the highest position in 2006 compared to other universities in Malaysia.

4. Recipient of the Prime Minister's Award in 2006.

5. Who successfully led UKM to great heights in achieving national and international excellence and recognition.

Hobbies
Tuanku Ja'afar had a passion for sports, especially golf and cricket. He was a painter.

Death
Tuanku Ja'afar died on 27 December 2008 at Hospital Tuanku Ja'afar, Seremban from a stroke.  He was 86 years old. His younger brother, Tunku Panglima Besar Tunku Tan Sri Abdullah had died four months earlier. Before Tuanku Ja'afar's death, he was admitted to the hospital after feeling dizziness. He was buried at the Seri Menanti Royal Mausoleum at Seri Menanti on 29 December 2008.

Honours

Colonel-in-chief of the Royal Signals Regiment

The Royal Signals Regiment (RSD) is a combat support regiment in the Malaysian Army. Its main role is to establish and secure communication facilities for the command and tactical elements of the Malaysian Army. This Regiment is also involved in providing electronic warfare support and securing all communication channels amongst formation quarters and tactical teams. As the Colonel-in-Chief for RSD, Tuanku Ja'afar ibni Almarhum Tuanku Abdul Rahman often participated in RSD-organised programs such as visits to military camps, sporting events such as the Novelty shooting competitions frequently held at shooting ranges.

Colonel-in-Chief of the Royal Electrical and Mechanical Engineers Corps

"The existence of the Royal Electrical and Mechanical Engineers Corps for over 50 decades would not be possible without the sacrifice and service of our previous and current soldiers. In this perilous journey so full of trials and tribulations, our fallen warriors are the national heroes who wished to see KJLJD excel not only on the national front but also in the international scene" – Colonel-in-Chief of the Royal Electrical and Mechanical Engineers Corps, Tuanku Ja'afar ibni Almarhum Tuanku Abdul Rahman.
The initial role of Royal Electrical and Mechanical Engineers Corps is to provide technical support such as the maintenance of many military equipment owned by the Malaysian Army. The Corps have now expanded to accommodate many more services.

Royal Malaysian Air Force
Tuanku Ja'afar also held the rank of Marshal of the Royal Malaysian Air Force.

Honours of Negeri Sembilan 
As Yang di-Pertuan Besar of Negeri Sembilan (8 April 1967 – 27 December 2008), he was:
  Founding Grand Master and Member of the Royal Family Order of Negeri Sembilan (DKNS, 24 May 1979 – 27 December 2008)
  Founding Grand Master of the Order of Negeri Sembilan (24 May 1979 – 27 December 2008)
  Founding Grand Master of the Royal Family Order of Yam Tuan Radin Sunnah (24 May 1979 – 27 December 2008)
  Founding Grand Master of the Order of Loyalty to Negeri Sembilan (24 May 1979 – 27 December 2008)
  Founding Grand Master of the Grand Order of Tuanku Ja'afar (Negeri Sembilan) (18 July 1984 – 27 December 2008)

Honours of Malaysia 
  (as Yang di-Pertuan Agong of Malaysia from 26 April 1994 to 25 April 1999) :
  Recipient & Grand Master of Order of the Royal House of Malaysia (DKM, 27 May 1994)
  Grand Master of the Order of the Crown of the Realm (earlier recipient 3 April 1968)
  Grand Master of the Order of the Defender of the Realm (earlier Grand Commander)
  Grand Master of the Order of Loyalty to the Crown of Malaysia
  Grand Master of the Order of Merit of Malaysia
  Founding Grand Master of the Order for Important Services (Malaysia) (2 May 1995 – 21 November 2001)
  Grand Master of the Order of the Royal Household of Malaysia
  : 
  First Class of the Royal Family Order of Johor (DK I)
  : 
  Member of the Royal Family Order of Kedah (DK) (1982)
  : 
  Recipient of the Royal Family Order of Kelantan or Star of Yunus (DK) 
  : 
  Member 1st class of the Family Order of the Crown of Indra of Pahang (DK I) (1987)
  : 
  Recipient of the Royal Family Order of Perak (DK) (1988)
  : 
  Recipient of the Perlis Family Order of the Gallant Prince Syed Putra Jamalullail (DK)
  : 
  First Class of the Royal Family Order of Selangor (DK I) (1982)
  : 
  Member first class of the Family Order of Terengganu (DK I)

Foreign honours 

He received many foreign awards during his years of royal service. These are:
  : 
 Grand Cross with Collar of the Order of the Southern Cross (18 December 1995)
  : 
  Royal Family Order of the Crown of Brunei (DKMB) (10 September 1996)
  Senior of the Family Order of Brunei (DK) (5 August 1968)
  : 
 Grand Collar of the Order of Independence of Cambodia
  : 
 Grand Collar of the Order of Merit (Chile) (27 September 1995)
  : 
 Grand Star of Djibouti
  : 
 Grand Cross with Collar of the Order of the White Rose of Finland (25 January 1995)
  : 
 Special Order of the Grand Cross of the Bundesverdienstkreuz (1996)
  : 
 Grand Collar of the Order of Sikatuna, Rank of Raja (21 June 1995)
  : 
 Grand Order of Mugunghwa
  : 
 Grand Cross with Collar of the Order of Civil Merit (24 March 1995)
  : 
 Knight with Collar of the Order of the Seraphim (22 February 1996)
  : 
 Medal of the Oriental Republic of Uruguay (3.7.1996)
  : 
 Knight Grand Cross of the Order of the Bath (GCB) (14 October 1998)

Tuanku Ja'afar Royal Gallery

The Tuanku Ja'afar Royal Gallery located nearby to Taman Tasik Seremban, is a building with an area of approximately 44,000 square feet that houses a gallery which was developed to revive the memories of Tuanku Ja'afar ibni Almarhum Tuanku Abdul Rahman. The Gallery was the brainchild of the Late ruler who wanted to build a gallery that portrayed the uniqueness of Negeri Sembilan's roots, the past royal rulers of Negeri Sembilan and his life journey. The Royal exhibition highlighted the exclusivity of the concept of 'Biographical Journey of Tuanku Ja'afar' with eight consecutive exhibition chambers.

Recognition 
Many places and landmarks were named after him. These are:
 Tuanku Ja'afar Power Station, Port Dickson, Negeri Sembilan
 Sekolah Menengah Sains Tuanku Ja'afar, Kuala Pilah, Negeri Sembilan
 Kolej Tuanku Ja'afar, Mantin, Negeri Sembilan
 Tuanku Ja'afar Hospital, Seremban, Negeri Sembilan
 Tuanku Ja'afar Royal Gallery, Seremban, Negeri Sembilan
 Sekolah Menengah Teknik Tuanku Jaafar (STTJ), Ampangan, Seremban, Negeri Sembilan
 Tuanku Ja'afar Cup
 Taman Tuanku Ja'afar, a residential area in Seremban, Negeri Sembilan
 SMK Taman Tuanku Ja'afar, a secondary school in Seremban, Negeri Sembilan
 Taman Tuanku Ja'afar Mosque in Seremban, Negeri Sembilan

Notes

Bibliography
 Halim, Tunku Abdullah, A Passion for Life, All-Media Publications, 1998, 

Monarchs of Malaysia
Ja'afar
1922 births
2008 deaths
Ja'afar
Marshals of the Royal Malaysian Air Force
Ambassadors of Malaysia to Egypt
High Commissioners of Malaysia to Nigeria
High Commissioners of Malaysia to Ghana
People from Selangor
Malaysian people of Minangkabau descent
Malaysian Muslims
Alumni of the London School of Economics
Alumni of the University of Nottingham

Recipients of the Darjah Kerabat Diraja Malaysia
First Classes of the Royal Family Order of Johor
Members of the Royal Family Order of Kedah
First Classes of the Family Order of Terengganu
First Classes of Royal Family Order of Selangor 

Collars of the Order of Civil Merit
Honorary Knights Grand Cross of the Order of the Bath
Grand Crosses Special Class of the Order of Merit of the Federal Republic of Germany
Federated Malay States people
People from British Malaya
20th-century Malaysian politicians
21st-century Malaysian politicians
Recipients of the Medal of the Oriental Republic of Uruguay
Recipients of the Order of the Crown of the Realm
First Classes of the Family Order of the Crown of Indra of Pahang
Recipients of the Order of Merit of Malaysia